Frederick John Dyer (26 June 1824 – 23 October 1866) was an English first-class cricketer and medical doctor.

The son of James Holland Dyer, he was born at Lewisham in June 1824. Dyer studied and trained to become a surgeon, for which he was a fellow of the Royal College of Surgeons. He played first-class cricket for the Gentlemen of Kent between 1849 and 1854, making four appearances against the Gentlemen of England. He scored 12 runs in his four matches, in addition to taking a single wicket. Dyer died from consumption at Stevenage in October 1866.

References

External links

1824 births
1866 deaths
People from Lewisham
English cricketers
Gentlemen of Kent cricketers
19th-century English medical doctors
Fellows of the Royal College of Surgeons
19th-century deaths from tuberculosis
Tuberculosis deaths in England